The 2017 WPA World Nine-ball Championship was the 26th edition of the 9-Ball pool World Championships. It took place from December 9 to 14, 2017 in the al-Attiya Sports Arena of the Al-Arabi Sports Club in Doha. The Qatari capital was the eighth time in a row the venue for the 9-Ball Championships.

The championship was won by Filipino Carlo Biado, who defeated his compatriot Roland Garcia 13–5 in the final. Third place went to Taiwanese Wu Kun-lin and fourth to Albanian Eklent Kaçi. Defending champion was the Austrian Albin Ouschan, who lost in the second round against Kun-lin. The world number one Chang Jung-Lin was defeated in the round of the last 64 of the Canadian John Morra.

Qualification
The tournament is attended by 128 players. 24 players qualified over the world rankings. A total of 92 starting places have been awarded according to a quota by the continental and regional associations as well as the hosting Qatari association and the sponsors. From December 5 to 7, 2017, a qualifying tournament was held, in which 96 participants in three knockout competitions played off the remaining 12 starting positions.

In the main tournament, the 128 participants were first divided into 16 groups of 8 players, in which they competed in the double knockout system from December 9 to 11 . Four players of each group qualified for the final round, which took place from December 12 to 14 and was played in the knockout system.

Tournament bracket

Preliminary round

Group 1

Group 2

Group 3

Group 4

Group 5

Group 6

Group 7

Group 8

Group 9

Group 10

Group 11

Group 12

Group 13

Group 14

Group 15

Group 16

Final round

Final
The final was played between two Filipino players, the two players alternate break. Carlo Biado reached 13 in the first place to win the championship.

Biado quickly dominated the first two games. He then took advantage of Garcia's mistakes to make the score 5–0, then 7–0. Garcia gets the first point in the eighth game, losing 1–7. However Garcia's perfectionism in the next game led Biado to raise the score to 8–1.

Garcia seemed to be back with two straight wins, with a 3–8 deficit. However, a good break from Biado, with a penalty shoot-out Garcia made the score continue to separate the 7 points is 10–3. However, at this time the results seem to have been determined. Biado quickly ended the match with a perfect game of breaking balls and win the match and the 9-Ball world championship for the first time.

Notes and references

Notes

References

External links
Official Website
 Empire Poker WPA World Pool Championship 2017 at azbilliards.com

2017
WPA World Nine-ball Championship
WPA World Nine-ball Championship
International sports competitions hosted by Qatar
Sports competitions in Doha